Hegel is the final album by the Italian singer-songwriter Lucio Battisti. It was released on 29 September  1994 by Numero Uno.

The album was Italy's 68th best selling album in 1994.

Track listing
All lyrics written by Pasquale Panella, all music composed by Lucio Battisti.
 "Almeno l'inizio" (At Least The Beginning) – 4:57
 "Hegel" – 5:15
 "Tubinga" (Tübingen) – 4:54
 "La bellezza riunita" (Beauty Put Together) – 5:07
 "La moda nel respiro" (The Fashion In The Breath)– 4:22
 "Stanze come questa" (Rooms Like This One) – 4:38
 "Estetica" (Aesthetics) – 5:11
 "La voce del viso" (The Voice Of The Face) – 4:13

References

1994 albums
Lucio Battisti albums